Shucked is a musical comedy with a book by Robert Horn and music and lyrics by Brandy Clark and Shane McAnally.

The Broadway production began previews at the Nederlander Theatre on March 8, 2023, with opening night scheduled for April 4.

Premise 
The rural Midwestern community of Cobb County’s corn crop is blighted, driving community member Maizy to follow the advice of her cousin Lulu to leave town and try to find a way to save their corn. Maizy travels to Tampa, Florida, where she meets Gordy Jackson, a con-man who claims he can help.

Background 
Shucked was partially derived from one of Horn's earlier projects, 2015's Moonshine: That Hee Haw Musical.

Productions
The show was first performed in 2022 at the Pioneer Memorial Theatre in Salt Lake City, Utah from October 28 to November 12, where it received positive reviews. Most of the Utah cast transferred with the show to Broadway.

Broadway
The Broadway production began previews on March 8, 2023. Two weeks prior, the song "Maybe Love" was released as part of rehearsal footage. In its first week of previews, the show grossed US$291,972, having sold 99% of its available tickets. 

The production is directed by Jack O'Brien. It features choreography by Sarah O'Gleby, orchestrations by Jason Howland, set design by Scott Pask, costume design by Tilly Grimes, lighting design by Japhy Weideman, sound design by John Shivers, and wig design by Mia Neal.

Cast

Awards

External links 
 Official website
 Internet Broadway Database

References 

2022 musicals
Broadway musicals
Original musicals
Plays set in the United States